Aylesbeare Common is a protected area in Devon, England.  It is composed largely of heathland and woodland, interspersed with a few streams and ponds.  There are several species of birds and insects which live in Aylesbeare Common, including a wider variety of butterfly species than in any other RSPB reserve.

External links

Parks and commons in Devon
Royal Society for the Protection of Birds reserves in England